McVeigh v. Cohen was a 1998 lawsuit in U.S. federal court in which a member of the U.S. Armed Forces challenged the military's application of its "Don't Ask, Don't Tell" (DADT) policy, which established guidelines for service by gays and lesbians in the U.S. military. The U.S. Navy sought to discharge Timothy R. McVeigh for declaring his homosexuality, which he had allegedly done via anonymous Internet posts. McVeigh's suit denied he had made such a declaration and charged the Navy with failure to adhere to its own DADT policy and, in the course of investigating him, with violating the Electronic Communications Privacy Act by collecting his private online communications.

McVeigh won a preliminary injunction against his discharge and the Navy, without acknowledging culpability, allowed him to retire with an honorable discharge. The New York Times called it "a victory for gay rights, with implications for the millions of people who use computer on-line services".

Background
Timothy R. McVeigh (no relation to convicted domestic terrorist Timothy McVeigh) entered the Navy at the age of 18 around 1980 and earned four Good Conduct Medals and the Navy Commendation Medal. His performance review in 1997 described him as "an outstanding role model" and the "embodiment of Navy core values". By that time he had reached the rank of Senior Chief Petty Officer.

In September 1997, while based in Honolulu and serving on the nuclear submarine USS Chicago (SSN-721), McVeigh sent email messages from his America Online (AOL) account that used the screen name "boysrch" and the signature "Tim" when communicating with Helen Hajny, a civilian working as a volunteer Ombudsman. The AOL user directory identified the marital status of the owner of that AOL account as "gay". Naval authorities suspected that the "boysrch" handle on AOL was being used by McVeigh and constituted an announcement of his homosexuality. A Navy paralegal, misrepresenting himself, obtained confirmation from AOL by telephone that the account belonged to McVeigh. The Navy initiated an administrative discharge on the basis of his "homosexual conduct, as evidenced by your statement that you are homosexual." A Navy disciplinary board held a hearing at which McVeigh acknowledged he had authored the email messages using the "boysrch" account and presented evidence of prior relationships with women. They concluded that by a preponderance of the evidence McVeigh had engaged in "homosexual conduct".

With his discharge scheduled for January 16, 1998, McVeigh, represented by Proskauer Rose, filed suit in U.S. District Court for the District of Columbia seeking a preliminary injunction to bar his discharge. His suit named Secretary of Defense William S. Cohen as principal defendant. At stake in addition to his job and income were the pension, health and life insurance, and other benefits when stepping down from the Navy honorably, as he expected to soon retire after 20 years of service. The Navy, after first resisting, acceded to the court's request to delay the discharge until January 27.

Privacy advocates supported McVeigh's suit. David L. Sobel of the Electronic Privacy Information Center said: "It is probably the most clear-cut example we have of a violation of this statute on the part of the Government. If the Navy prevails, it will basically mean there is no meaningful protection against government intrusion in cyberspace." An America Online spokesman said: "We have clear policies in place that our member service representatives don't give out member information. What is disturbing to us is that the Navy may have circumvented established channels that we have for working with law enforcement in an attempt to get information about one of our members." A representative of the Servicemembers Legal Defense Network, an advocacy group for gay and lesbian military personnel, said: "Timothy McVeigh didn't work hard to get on anybody's radar screen. The only information that the Navy has is this AOL profile, and I think there's a strong argument that this is the sort of case that demands discretion from the military."

Frank Rich thought McVeigh could be:
 
Rich contrasted the different treatment the U.S. military afforded the two men named Timothy McVeigh. For years the U.S. Army ignored the racism and anti-government radicalism of Timothy J. McVeigh, who went on to perpetrate the Oklahoma City bombing in 1995. The U.S. Navy by contrast "torments the second, exemplary Timothy [R.] McVeigh for the crime of having a private life that should be nobody's business but his own".

Before a hearing in the case, AOL acknowledged that its customer service representative should not have released information about McVeigh. It also said the Navy had violated federal law and reported that it had lodged protests with the Navy and Department of Defense. McVeigh's attorney also brought to court a statement from sociologist Charles Moskos of Northwestern University, architect of the DADT policy, who supported McVeigh and called the Navy's investigation of his sexual orientation "unwarranted". In Moskos's words: "In simple terms, Senior Chief McVeigh did not 'tell' in a manner contemplated under the policy – he sent an anonymous e-mail which did not list his surname or his Navy connection".

Opinion
On January 26, 1998, U.S. District Court Judge Stanley Sporkin granted McVeigh a preliminary injunction barring the Navy from discharging him. He wrote that the central issue was whether the Navy complied with its own Don't Ask, Don't Tell (DADT) policy and, by extension, "whether there is really a place for gay officers in the military under the new policy". Sporkin sometimes referred to DADT by its longer name – "Don't Ask, Don't Tell, Don't Pursue" – as he questioned the Navy's pursuit of information about McVeigh. He wrote:

Sporkin quoted DADT guidelines that specified that "creditable information" from a "reliable person" about sexual orientation was required to prompt an investigation. Instead, he wrote:

Sporkin also called it a "search and 'outing' mission". He noted that "cyberspace ... invites fantasy and affords anonymity", an environment at odds with the regulatory requirement that the subject of an investigation show "a likelihood actually to carry out homosexual acts". He also found that the Navy's investigation had "likely violated" the Electronic Communications Privacy Act of 1986. Though the government had argued that the statute penalized the party that disclosed information, in this case AOL, and not the party requesting information, he wrote:
To the government's argument that McVeigh had acknowledged owning the AOL account, Sporkin wrote:

Sporkin concluded with his view of the significance of the DADT policy:
In conclusion, the court granted McVeigh the preliminary injunction and his discharge was overturned as an "immediate and irreparable injury" to McVeigh's career and reputation.

Settlement and impact 
Clarence Page, writing in the Chicago Tribune, said that the case was "a defining test of the right to privacy in cyberspace and in the military. The military flunked. So did a major on-line service." Arthur Leonard of New York Law School commented: "Every one of these cases that comes to the public's attention reinforces the absurdity of the [DADT] policy, and that can only help us in the long run. It's just a shame some people are turned into martyrs, but it looks as if in this case McVeigh won't be a martyr."

The parties began negotiating McVeigh's retirement with full benefits. A Defense Department official said: "I think many of us would like to see this case go away." But McVeigh's attorney complained that in the days after Sporkin's ruling the Navy had assigned McVeigh to "supervising people moving trash out of a room that's being renovated". In March, Judge Sporkin was asked to consider if the Navy had violated his order not to take any "adverse action" against McVeigh, who contended that the Navy had not provided him with an assignment comparable to his rank and experience. As negotiations continued, Defense Secretary Cohen supported the Navy's position in the case and warned Attorney General Janet Reno that any settlement needed to make clear the Clinton administration's full support for DADT.

McVeigh and the Navy agreed to a settlement in June 1998. The Navy did not admit any wrongdoing and agreed not to pursue an appeal. McVeigh was allowed to retire with the rank of Master Chief Petty Officer and full benefits. He commented: "I'm happy that this case has been resolved on my terms. I think that all sailors can take comfort from this. I hope it sends a message that the rules and regulations that are in place need to be followed by the military." His attorney said: "It is the first time, as far as I'm aware, that the Navy has let stand a court decision that it has broken the law in this area. Obviously it has a precedent that can be relied on in the future." The Navy also paid McVeigh's $90,000 in legal expenses.

McVeigh retired from the Navy on July 14, 1998. He said he had been treated well by other service members "with an exception of a few senior officers in the submarine squadron". He said: "I think the Navy has been fairly pig-headed. I just got set up and this thing just getting passed up the line and no one stopped to look at it."

In a separate settlement reached months earlier but not announced until McVeigh settled with the Navy, America Online apologized and agreed to pay McVeigh damages for having improperly disclosed his identity. Outside the settlement, AOL announced plans to provide all of its 5,000 customer-service representatives with "scenario training" to protect their clients' privacy, and it posted a new version of its privacy policy online written to be "understandable to us mere mortals".

References

External links
NPR Talk of the Nation: "Don't Ask, Don't Tell", January 19, 1998, radio broadcast with Dixon Osburn of Servicemembers Legal Defense Network, Alec Farr of Proskauer, Rose, and Charles Moskos Northwestern University Professor of Sociology
Documents relating to the case
Netlitigation case summary

United States District Court for the District of Columbia cases
McVeigh v. Cohen
1998 in LGBT history
LGBT rights in the United States
United States Internet case law
Proskauer Rose
1998 in the United States